Shelby Lynne is an American country pop singer-songwriter. Her discography consists of 16 studio albums and 29 singles released between 1988 and 2020.

Studio albums

1980s and 1990s

2000s and 2010s

2020s

Holiday albums

Compilation albums

Singles

1980s and 1990s

2000s and 2010s

As a featured artist

Music videos

References

Country music discographies
Pop music discographies
Discographies of American artists